Noble Winfred Ballou (November 30, 1897 – January 30, 1963) was an American professional baseball pitcher who appeared in 99 games, 71 of them as a reliever, in Major League Baseball between 1925 and 1929 for the Washington Senators, St. Louis Browns and Brooklyn Robins. He spent his college days at Eastern Kentucky University.

Ballou's pitching career took place over 21 seasons between 1922 and 1944. He threw  innings of hitless, shutout relief, but Washington lost both games en route to a seven-game defeat at the hands of the Pittsburgh Pirates. Traded to St. Louis the following February, Ballou appeared in 43 games for the  Browns and won 11 games, second on the club, and saved two more for a team that finished seventh and won only 62 games all year. In his final major-league season, he appeared in 25 games for the Brooklyn Robins, but he was ineffective and his MLB career ended at age 31. 

In his 99 career games, Ballou won 19 games and lost 20, with ten complete games, no shutouts and three saves. In  innings pitched, he allowed 398 hits, 168 bases on balls and 187 earned runs, for a career ERA of 5.11. He struck out 109.

Ballou continued to pitch professionally in the top-level Pacific Coast League for 14 more seasons. He won 24 games (losing 13) for the Los Angeles Angels in 1931, then posted an 18–8 record for the 1935 San Francisco Seals.

He died in San Francisco, aged 65, on January 29, 1963.

External links

1897 births
1963 deaths
Baseball players from Kentucky
Brooklyn Robins players
Chattanooga Lookouts players
Eastern Kentucky Colonels baseball players
Los Angeles Angels (minor league) players
Major League Baseball pitchers
Milwaukee Brewers (minor league) players
Paris Bourbons players
People from Whitley County, Kentucky
Washington Senators (1901–1960) players
St. Louis Browns players
San Francisco Seals (baseball) players
Vicksburg Hill Billies players